Exiles is the tenth album by American singer-songwriter Dan Fogelberg, released in 1987 (see 1987 in music). It is best remembered for the A/C hits, "Lonely in Love" and “Seeing You Again” and the pop hit, "She Don't Look Back".

Track listing
All tracks composed by Dan Fogelberg; except where indicated
"Exiles" – 4:13
"What You're Doing" – 4:52
"Lonely in Love" – 5:30
"Seeing You Again" – 5:00
"She Don't Look Back" – 4:49
"The Way It Must Be" – 4:17
"Hearts in Decline" – 3:14
"It Doesn't Matter" (Chris Hillman, Stephen Stills) – 4:32
"Our Last Farewell" – 4:50
"Beyond the Edge" – 3:46 (Not included on the original LP)

Personnel 
 Dan Fogelberg – lead vocals, backing vocals (1, 3–9), electric guitar (1, 3, 5, 8, 9), acoustic piano (2, 3, 4, 7, 9), lead guitar (2, 5, 8, 9), vibraphone (2), horn arrangements (2), acoustic guitar (3, 6, 8, 9), synth guitar (3), synthesizers (4, 9), rhythm guitar (5, 8, 9), drum programming (5), string arrangements
 Mike Hanna – keyboards (1–6, 8, 9), string arrangements
 Michael Landau – rhythm guitar (2), electric guitar (3, 4, 6)
 Mike Porcaro – bass (1, 4, 5, 9)
 Bob Glaub – bass (2, 3, 8)
 Larry Klein – bass (6)
 Russ Kunkel – drums (1–4, 9), percussion (2, 3, 5), drum programming (5)
 Niko Bolas – drum programming (5)
 Andy Newmark – drums (6)
 Rick Marotta – drums (8)
 Joe Lala – percussion (8)
 Michael Brecker – tenor saxophone (1, 3)
 Tower of Power – horn arrangements (2)
 Julia Waters – backing vocals (2)
 Maxine Waters – backing vocals (2)
 Oren Waters – backing vocals (2)

Production
 Producers – Dan Fogelberg and Russ Kunkel
 Assistant Producer – Charlie Fernandez
 Recorded and Mixed by Niko Bolas
 Mix Assistant – Dave Glover
 Recorded at One On One Studios (North Hollywood, CA); Sunset Sound and Record One (Los Angeles, CA); Lahaina Sound Recording (Maui, Hawaii).
 Mixed at Sunset Sound
 Mastered by George Marino at Sterling Sound (New York, NY).
 Art Direction – Kurt Calcagno and George Osaki
 Cover Art Concept – Dan Fogelberg
 Photography – Wayne Maser and Levon Parian
 Management – Front Line Management

Charts
Album 

Singles – Billboard (North America)

References

Dan Fogelberg albums
1987 albums
Albums produced by Russ Kunkel